Joseph Woyee is a Liberian singer, drummer, composer and Zoto artist.

Biography
Woyee was born in Greenville, Sinoe County, in Liberia to a teacher and a medical office worker. After his family moved to the capital Monrovia, Woyee helped to found "The Children of the Green Acres," one of the first bands that played Liberian-style music as opposed to U.S. pop music. In 1980, Woyee moved to the U.S. to attend the University of Minnesota, and, as of 2007, was working in Minnesota and producing Liberian-style music. He once described the newly formed African Union as "a good idea that is guaranteed to go bad."

References

External links
 Kinzo Music Works, including photo of Woyee
 Sample of Liberian music with Woyee

Year of birth missing (living people)
Living people
Liberian singers
University of Minnesota alumni
People from Sinoe County
American drummers
Musicians from Monrovia